A pathogen is a microorganism in the widest sense that causes disease in its host.

Pathogen  may also refer to:

 Pathogen (Two Steps from Hell album), 2007
 Pathogen (Made of Hate album), 2010
 Pathogen (film), a 2006 zombie horror independent film 
 "Pathogen" (Stargate Universe), an episode of Stargate Universe